Fencehouses railway station served the village of Fencehouses, Tyne and Wear, England from 1841 to 1964 on the Leamside line.

History 
The station was opened in August 1841 by the Durham Junction Railway. It was situated near the north of the level crossing on Station Avenue. Goods sidings were behind the down platform, while more sidings were behind the up platform, branching off to a mineral depot. Adjacent to the station was also a goods shed with a track running through as well as cattle pens and a loading dock to the south. The goods handled at the station were tar and livestock. Further extensions to this route ultimately led to creation of the Leamside line.

By 1951, passenger bookings had fallen sharply from 141,237 to 21,340. The Beeching Report dealt severely with the County Durham area of railways, leaving only one passenger service running at 5:01am. Passenger services were withdrawn on 4 May 1964 and goods traffic followed a month later on 1 June 1964. It was still used for Miners' Gala trains until 18 July 1964.

References

External links 

Disused railway stations in Tyne and Wear
Former North Eastern Railway (UK) stations
Railway stations in Great Britain opened in 1841
Railway stations in Great Britain closed in 1964
1841 establishments in England
1964 disestablishments in England
Beeching closures in England